Naval Hospital Oakland, also known as Oak Knoll Naval Hospital, was a U.S. naval hospital located in Oakland, California that opened during World War II (1942) and closed in 1996 as part of the 1993 Base Realignment and Closure program.

Oak Knoll hospital was built during World War II for the purpose of treating American military personnel who had been wounded in the Pacific theater.  In later years it also treated those who had been wounded in the Korean and Vietnam wars.   The site was previously a golf course and country club which had closed during the Great Depression.

A large main hospital building was started in 1965 and opened in 1968.  The base was closed in 1996 in an official Navy ceremony.

This building was imploded on 8 April 2011.

Oak Knoll and Lehman Brothers bankruptcies
In 2005, a partnership of Lehman Brothers and SunCal (a land developer from Southern California) bought the site for $100 million with plans to build a master-planned community featuring 960 homes, a shopping area and a  park. In 2008, SunCal began demolition, but then Lehman suddenly collapsed in September of that year, cutting off financing for the project.  The demolition work was stopped for over a year, although SunCal initiated legal action against Lehman in November 2008 in order to obtain the cleanup funds and resolve other issues involving the property.

In October 2009, SunCal secured $550,000 from Lehman that was used for property-wide weed abatement, cleaning up wood piles, repairing perimeter fences and providing a team of armed security guards 24 hours per day to help secure the property from trespassers.  In March 2010, SunCal secured a written agreement between the Lehman/SunCal bankruptcy trustee and a remediation firm on a $3.7 million plan to demolish numerous wooden outbuildings throughout the former base; all of these wooden structures have since been removed. The former Club Knoll Officers' Club was spared so that it may be restored in the future.

In January 2011, the presiding federal judge in Lehman Brothers' bankruptcy approved the release of $1.7 million to complete the major demolition work at Oak Knoll.  This meant that demolition of the major concrete and steel buildings would move forward; the warehouse and the bachelor enlisted quarters have since been removed. The 11-story hospital building, the largest structure on the site, was taken down in the spring of 2011.  All structures to be demolished were first cleared of lead and asbestos.

SunCal itself is not in bankruptcy and continues to do business.  SunCal still plans to redevelop the property into a master-planned community, but with a new financial partner.  However, this is dependent on the outcome of the Lehman Brothers bankruptcy which continues to make its way through court.

In November 2008, 14 SunCal projects filed for bankruptcy protection in the wake of the Lehman Brothers collapse; these were all properties where Lehman was involved. The entity that owns Oak Knoll, SunCal Oak Knoll LLC, filed for Chapter 11 bankruptcy in January 2009. The case is in United States bankruptcy court for the Central District in Santa Ana, CA, case 8:08-bk-17588.

San Leandro Naval Hospital
San Leandro Naval Hospital was built on the rolling hills next to Naval Hospital Oakland, to care for Troops that needed neuropsychiatric care during World War 2.  The 500 beds Hospital opened on August 125, 1944 and closed on September 1, 1946. Neuropsychiatric care was for what was called shell shock, war neurosis and combat fatigue, today called Post-traumatic stress disorder (PTSD). The hospital was soon expanded to 1,500 beds. At it closing to was turned over to Naval Hospital Oakland. In 1951 San Leandro Naval Hospital was reopened for Korean War Troop patients. In 1964 the US Navy sold the hospital and its land to a housing developer. The funds from this sale was used to built a modern hospital building at nearby Naval Hospital Oakland. The San Leandro Naval Hospital land is now the Sequoyah Hills housing subdivision.

See also
Base Realignment and Closure
Urban Exploration
California during World War II

References

External links
SunCal website
Redevelopment Plan Information
article on Oak Knoll at California State Military Museum, with historical aerial photo
Oak Knoll community coalition website
article on area military history with photos, Sequoya Homeowners Association website
Northern California at Former Bases

Medical installations of the United States Navy
Hospital buildings completed in 1942
History of Oakland, California
Defunct hospitals in California
Hospitals disestablished in 1996
Hospitals in the San Francisco Bay Area
Military in the San Francisco Bay Area
Military history of California
Hospitals in Oakland, California
1942 establishments in California